The Butterfly is a 1914 American silent short film directed by Tom Ricketts starring Charlotte Burton, George Field, Edward Coxen, Edith Borella, Jean Durrell, Ida Lewis and John Steppling.

External links

1914 films
American silent short films
American black-and-white films
Films directed by Tom Ricketts
1910s American films